William Whiting was an English footballer who played as a half-back for Southampton in the 1900s, before becoming a referee.

Football career
Whiting played football as an amateur for Fitzhugh Rovers before joining Southampton of the Southern League in 1901. In his six years at the "Saints", he only made four first-team appearances but in excess of 200 appearances for the reserves.

His first-team debut came when he replaced the injured Samuel Meston at right-half in a 4–1 victory over Kettering Town on 15 February 1902. He made two first-team appearances in the 1902–03 season, with his final appearance in the Southern League coming on 10 April 1905.

In 1905, he was a member of the Southampton Reserves team which won the Hampshire Senior Cup.

He left Southampton in the summer of 1907 to join Salisbury City where he spent a season, before joining Eastleigh Athletic.

Career as a referee
After the First World War, Whiting became a referee in Southampton, and was promoted to the Southern League list in September 1921.

References

Year of birth missing
Year of death missing
Footballers from Southampton
English footballers
Southern Football League players
Southampton F.C. players
Salisbury City F.C. (1905) players
English football referees
Eastleigh Athletic F.C. players
Association football defenders